APINACA (AKB48, N-(1-adamantyl)-1-pentyl-1H-indazole-3-carboxamide) is a drug that acts as a reasonably potent agonist for the cannabinoid receptors, with a Ki of 304.5nM and an EC50 of 585nM at CB1. It had never previously been reported in the scientific or patent literature, and was first identified by laboratories in Japan in March 2012 as an ingredient in synthetic cannabis smoking blends, along with a related compound APICA. Structurally, it closely resembles cannabinoid compounds from a University of Connecticut patent (WO 2003/035005), but with a simple pentyl chain on the indazole 1-position, and APINACA falls within the claims of this patent despite not being disclosed as an example.

Legality

APINACA was made illegal in Japan in 2012, and was banned as a temporary class drug in New Zealand from 13 July 2012.

APINACA has been banned in Latvia since 14 November 2013.

Since 2013, APINACA has been a Schedule I controlled substance in the United States.

It is also banned in Germany as an Anlage II controlled drug.

APINACA is listed in the Fifth Schedule of the Misuse of Drugs Act (MDA) and therefore illegal in Singapore as of May 2015.

As of October 2015 APINACA is a controlled substance in China.

APINACA is banned in the Czech Republic.

Detection
A forensic standard of APINACA is available, and the compound has been posted on the Forendex website of potential drugs of abuse.

See also 

 5F-AB-PINACA
 5F-ADB
 5F-AMB
 5F-APINACA
 5F-CUMYL-PINACA
 AB-CHFUPYCA
 AB-CHMINACA
 AB-FUBINACA
 AB-PINACA
 ADAMANTYL-THPINACA
 ADB-CHMINACA
 ADB-FUBINACA
 ADB-PINACA
 ADBICA
 APICA
 FUB-APINACA
 MDMB-CHMICA
 PX-3
 SDB-001
 STS-135
 Synthetic cannabinoid
 Synthetic cannabis

References 

Adamantanes
Cannabinoids
Designer drugs
Indazolecarboxamides